The Israel Picard House is a historic house located at 690 County Street in Fall River, Massachusetts.

Description and history 
It is a two-story structure, built out of pink Fall River granite, which is partly obscured by the elaborate wooden Queen Anne porch that wraps around the front and parts of the sides. The house was built in 1897 for Israel Picard, owner of the quarry which provided the stone, and it may have served in part as an advertisement for his products.

The house was listed on the National Register of Historic Places on February 16, 1983.

See also
National Register of Historic Places listings in Fall River, Massachusetts

References

Houses in Fall River, Massachusetts
National Register of Historic Places in Fall River, Massachusetts
Houses on the National Register of Historic Places in Bristol County, Massachusetts
Queen Anne architecture in Massachusetts
Houses completed in 1897